Aziz Retzep (born 18 January 1992) is a German-Greek footballer who plays as a goalkeeper for TSG Dülmen.

Career
Retzep made his professional debut for Preußen Münster in the 3. Liga on 21 February 2014, coming on as a substitute in the 66th minute for midfielder Benjamin Siegert in the away match against VfB Stuttgart II after starting goalkeeper Daniel Masuch was sent off. The match finished as a 0–0 draw.

References

External links
 Profile at DFB.de
 Profile at kicker.de
 

1992 births
Living people
People from Dülmen
Sportspeople from Münster (region)
Footballers from North Rhine-Westphalia
German footballers
Greek footballers
German people of Greek descent
Association football goalkeepers
SC Preußen Münster players
3. Liga players